Haspel is a surname. Notable people with the surname include:

David Haspel Shepard (1940–2017), American film preservationist
Gina Haspel (born 1956), American intelligence officer
Joseph Haspel (c. 1883 - 1959), inventor of the seersucker suit
Judith Haspel (1918–2004), Austrian-born Israeli swimmer
Rachel Oestreicher Haspel, now known as Rachel Oestreicher Bernheim (born 1943), American human rights advocate
Tamar Haspel, American food columnist 
Wilhelm Haspel (1898-1952), German business executive

See also
Haspel Corporation, fictional company